Bitovo is a small village located in the region of Porece in the municipality of Makedonski Brod, North Macedonia. It used to be part of the former municipality of Samokov.

Demographics
According to the 2002 census, the village had a total of 63 inhabitants. Ethnic groups in the village include:

Macedonians 63

References

Villages in Makedonski Brod Municipality